Subconscious Dissolution Into the Continuum is the fourth studio album by the British doom metal band Esoteric. It was released on 28 June 2004 through Season of Mist records, and is engineered, mixed and mastered by Esoteric at Priory Recording Studios. Artwork by Chris Peters.

Track listing

Credits
Gordon Bicknell -- Guitar
Greg Chandler -- vocals, guitar
Steve Peters -- Guitar, bass guitar
Keith York -- drums
Trevor Lines -- Session bass guitar

2004 albums
Esoteric (band) albums
Season of Mist albums